Sunitha is an Indian actress known for her roles in films made in South India from 1986 to 1996.

Movie career
She entered the film industry through the movie Kodai Mazhai, a 1986 Tamil movie directed by Muktha S. Sundar, with music by Ilayaraja, starring Rajinikanth (Not Major, Guest Role), Prasad and Lakshmi and Ponmana Selvan (1989), starring Vijayakanth, directed by P. Vasu. The same year saw the release of Vijayakanth's movie Rajanadai and Varavu Nalla Uravu (1990), a family movie, for which director Visu won the Tamil Nadu State Award for Best Story Writer. She was also in Nenja Thottu Sollu a Tamil movie, a female oriented story based on a character called Pongona, directed by T. N. Kanna.

She starred in the Malayalam movies Nirabhedangal, directed by Sajan, starring Prathap Pothen, Ambika and Geetha and Kanikanum Neram, directed by Rajasenan, starring Ratheesh and Saritha in 1987. Her popular movies include Mrugaya, a Malayalam action drama written by A. K. Lohithadas and directed by IV Sasi; starring Mammootty Appu,  directed by Dennis Joseph and written by Sreekumaran Thampi, starring Mohanlal and K. R. Vijaya; Gajakesariyogam, directed by P. G. Viswambharan, starring Innocent and Mukesh, and Neelagiri, directed by I. V. Sasi,  written by Ranjith and Georgootty C/O Georgootty, produced under the banner of Chandragiri Productions. It was Haridas' directorial debut. Haridas won the State Award for Best New face Director for this film, starring Jayaram and Thilakan, She starred in Mimics Parade and Kasargod Khader Bhai, comedy films directed by Thulasidas, starring Siddique and Jagadeesh; Pookkalam Varavayi, directed by Kamal, written by Ranjith and Nathan, starring Jayaram and Shamili; Savidham, directed by George Kithu, starring Nedumudi Venu and Santhi Krishna; Snehasagaram, directed by Sathyan Anthikkad, starring Murali and Manoj K. Jayan; Mukha Chithram, directed by Suresh Unnithan; Samooham, directed by Sathyan Anthikad, with Suhasini Manirathnam and Suresh Gopi; Vatsalyam, directed by Cochin Haneefa, written by Lohithadas, starring Mammootty and Geetha; Nandini Oppol, directed by Mohan Kuplari, starring Geetha and Nedumudi Venu; Sowbhagyam, directed by Sandhya Mohan; Pradakshinam, directed by Pradeep Chockli, starring Manoj K. Jayan and Balachandran Chullikkadu, and Kaliveedu, a family drama exploring a marital relationship, directed by Sibi Malayil, starring Jayaram and Manju Warrier.

She entered the Kannada film industry in 1990 through the movies Anukulakobba Ganda, directed by M. S. Rajashekar, starring Raghavendra Rajkumar; Aralida Hoovugalu, directed by Chi Dattharaj, starring Shivarajkumar and Srinath; Puksatte Ganda Hotte Tumba Unda a typical drama movie directed by Raj Kishore, starring Ambareesh and Roll Call Ramakrishna, directed by B. Rama Murthy, produced by S. R. Raajeshwari, with music by Upendra Kumar, starring Ananth Nag and Devraj.

She has paired with leading Indian actors such as Mammootty, Mohanlal, Jagadish, Mukesh, Jayaram, Suresh Gopi, Ambareesh, Anant Nag, Shivaraj Kumar, Raghavendra Rajkumar and many others.

As a dancer
Sunitha, alternatively known as Kodai Mazhai Vidya and Vidyasree, is a well known Indian classical dancer. She is trained in the Bharata Natyam style of dancing. She began dancing at the age of 3 and did her arangetram at the age of 11. She has had the privilege of experiencing the old tradition of "Gurukulam". She received her training in the Vazhuvoor style of Bharatanatyam from Padmashree Vazhuvoor Ramaiyya Pillai and his son Kalaimamani Vazhuvoor R. Samaraj. To date, she has given more than 200 dance recitals all over the world. She has performed dances in many stage shows all over the world with Amitabh Bachchan, Mammootty, Mohanlal, Vineeth etc.

Sunitha owns and serves as artistic director at the Nrithyanjali School of Dance, based in United States. She has enriched the cultural life of South Carolina by dedicating herself to teaching and performing classical dance over the past ten years.

Personal life
She is born to Venugopal Shivaramakrishnan and Bhuvana in Palakkad, Kerala(3). She married Raj in 1996 and has a son, Shashaank, born in 1998. She currently resides in South Carolina, United States with her family.

Filmography

TV serial
 Ini Njan Onnu Visramikkatte - DD Malayalam serial

References

3.^https://digital.mathrubhumi.com/m5/3008463/Grihalakshmi/Grihalakshmi-2021-March-1-15#sample/5/1

External links
 

Living people
Indian film actresses
Actresses in Malayalam cinema
21st-century Indian actresses
20th-century Indian actresses
Actresses in Hindi cinema
Actresses in Kannada cinema
Actresses in Telugu cinema
Actresses in Tamil cinema
Actresses in Malayalam television
Year of birth missing (living people)